Dahyaji Gobarji Vanzara, popularly known as D. G. Vanzara, is the former Inspector-General of Police (IG) from Gujarat, India. He was in judicial custody from 2007 until his bail in 2015 on charges of having conducted a series of extrajudicial killings, while heading the Anti-Terrorist Squad (ATS). He was acquitted in Sohrabuddin case in 2017.

Vanzara joined the Gujarat Police as Deputy Superintendent of Police (DSP) in 1980; upgraded to IPS officer in 1987 and got retired on 31 May 2014 as Deputy IG (DIG). After getting clean chit in fake encounter cases in February 2020, he was promoted to Inspector-General of Police (IG) post-retirement with effect from 29 September 2007.

Cases
An IPS officer of the 1987 batch, his tenure as head of the city crime bureau saw a spurt (rise) in encounter killings.

The suspect killings include:
 Sameer Khan (shot dead Sep 2002).
 Sadik Jamal (killed 2003).
 Ishrat Jahan and three others (shot dead 15 June 2004).
 Sohrabuddin Sheikh (shot dead Nov 2005).
 Sheikh's wife Kausar Bi (killed in Vanzara's village).
 Tulsiram Prajapati (killed on 28 December 2006).

As of September 2013, there were 32 police officers, including six IPS officers, who were in jail for these encounters. Most of them had worked under Vanzara.

Vanzara himself had a meteoric rise since the early 2000s, when the encounters to eliminate terrorists began.

In 2013, in his letter of resignation, Vanzara stated,

On 18 May 2008, ex-DSP N K Amin, also arrested in the case, told the court, "that a police-politician-criminal nexus was in operation in the
Sohrabuddin Sheikh case". The high level of direct communication from Amit Shah, as minister, to an on-duty officer has also been questioned in court.

In the Tulsiram Prajapati case, the encounter killing took place in Banaskantha district. Just 13 days earlier, Vanzara was surprisingly transferred there as DIG Border range. On questioning, Amit Shah could not remember why. Shah has been indicted as the "kingpin and prime accused" in the Tulsiram Prajapati murder case.

Vanzara's letter also refers to political mileage obtained from the killings. In the 2007 elections, Modi had asked the electorate as to what was to be done with people like Sohrabuddin, to thunderous responses of "Kill him!".

In September 2013, after six years in prison, Vanzara, who calls himself a "nationalist Hindu" and looks upon Narendra Modi as "god", has become disgruntled. He is said to have suggested a connection between the Sohrabuddin Sheikh case and the unsolved murder of ex-BJP minister Haren Pandya, who at one time a minister under Narendra Modi. Pandya was shot dead while out on a morning walk in March 2003, a year after his fallout with Modi. In 2003, it was Vanzara who had originally investigated the Pandya murder. Similar claims have also been made by the DNA newspaper, which has suggested that Sheikh was eliminated because of his links to the political murder of Pandya.

Vanzara was released on bail on 18 February 2015. He was acquitted in Sohrabuddin case in August 2017, due to lack of evidence.

References

Living people
Indian police chiefs
Year of birth missing (living people)
Prisoners and detainees of India